Abr Bakuh (also Romanized as Abr Bakūh; also known as Abrbakoo and Īrebkū) is a village in Gharbi Rural District, in the Central District of Ardabil County, Ardabil Province, Iran. At the 2006 census, its population was 211, in 37 families.

References 

Towns and villages in Ardabil County